Leonardo Lourenço Bastos (born 6 July 1975), commonly known as Léo, is a retired Brazilian footballer who played as a left back.

He spent most of his professional career with Santos and Benfica, arriving at the latter at the age of 25 and winning eight major titles, winning the same amount with the former during his two spells.

Léo represented Brazil in two Confederations Cups.

Club career

Brazil
Léo was born in Campos dos Goytacazes, Rio de Janeiro. Local-based Americano Futebol Clube gave him his professional debut in 1996, and the next year he moved to São Paulo with União São João Esporte Clube. Two seasons later he was bought by Sociedade Esportiva Palmeiras but, within six months, he was shown the door by coach Luiz Felipe Scolari.

Subsequently, Léo joined Santos FC for R$1.6 million fee, quickly becoming an integral part of the team: in 2002, playing alongside the likes of Diego, Elano, Renato and Robinho, he won his first Série A championship, losing the following year's Copa Libertadores.

Benfica
After having appeared in 201 official games for Santos, aged 30, Léo signed for S.L. Benfica from Portugal for an undisclosed fee, on a three-year contract. He made his Primeira Liga debut on 18 September 2005 in a 4–0 home win against U.D. Leiria, and played in an average of 27 league matches in his first three seasons, but the club came out empty on major silverware.

In the 2005–06 campaign, Léo appeared 36 in official games (all starts) as the team reached the quarter-finals of the UEFA Champions League.

Return to Santos
In 2008–09, Léo began suffering stiff competition for the left-back position from compatriot David Luiz. On 14 January 2009 he left Benfica and returned to Santos, continuing to display solid performances in spite of his age.

Léo was an important defensive unit during 2011 Paulista League, being also elected the best left-back of the tournament. He also featured in all 12 matches for the club in Libertadores winning campaign, as well appearing in the 2011 FIFA Club World Cup Final loss to FC Barcelona.

Léo featured only in four games during the 2012 Paulista League which was won by Santos, mostly due to the club's participation in the Libertadores – he also appeared 17 times in the national league. In September, he suffered a knee injury.

After acting as a starter during the 2013 Paulista, Léo lost his left-back starting position to newly signed Eugenio Mena, and changed his position to midfielder in August 2013. On 3 October he scored the last goal in a 3–0 home win over São Paulo FC, after coming on as a substitute for Thiago Ribeiro; however, later in the same month he again injured his knee, being sidelined for the remainder of the season.

Léo returned to action on 3 April 2014, playing 16 minutes in a 0–0 draw at Mixto Esporte Clube for that year's Copa do Brasil. On the 24th, he was told that his contract (which was due to expire in six days) would not be renewed, and he later announced his retirement via Facebook, stating that "even though I feel I can still play, I can not see myself wearing another club's shirt"; additionally, he also sent a "special thanks to the great nation of Santos's supporters", saying: "It was for them I fought for every ball, celebrated every win and each one of the greatest titles".

Léo played 455 games for Santos all competitions comprised, entering the club's history books as the player with more titles won after the Pelé era and also ranking tenth in the list of total appearances.

International career
Léo earned his first cap for Brazil on 31 May 2001, in the first game of the 2001 FIFA Confederations Cup, against Cameroon (2–0 win). He made five appearances during the tournament, with the national team finishing in fourth position.

Léo was also selected for the 2005 Confederations Cup, in Germany. As Gilberto's backup, he only featured against Japan (2–2 group stage draw) as the Seleção went on to win the competition.

Controversies
Léo's career was often surrounded by controversy. In late 2010, after São Paulo failed to qualify to the 2011 Copa Libertadores, he said its supporters should be content "to watch" the competition on television.

The following year, when Santos won the continental tournament, he doubted of the capacity of its opponent in that year's FIFA Club World Cup, Barcelona, who went on to win it 4–0, however. In 2012, when Corinthians won the Libertadores and qualified to the following Club World Cup, he displayed irony while describing the trouble caused by the club's fans at the São Paulo–Guarulhos International Airport, saying "he who is accustomed to train stations, should not go to airports".

In March 2013, Léo regretted having made the comments about Corinthians, stating: "I am already 37 years old. I'll be quiet from now on. I won't speak what I'm thinking anymore (laughs). [...] Controversies are over".

Career statistics

Club

Honours
Santos
Campeonato Brasileiro Série A: 2002, 2004
Campeonato Paulista: 2010, 2011, 2012
Copa do Brasil: 2010
Copa Libertadores: 2011
Recopa Sudamericana: 2012

Brazil
FIFA Confederations Cup: 2005

Individual
Bola de Prata: 2001, 2003, 2004
Campeonato Paulista best left-back: 2011

References

External links

1975 births
Living people
People from Campos dos Goytacazes
Brazilian footballers
Association football defenders
Campeonato Brasileiro Série A players
União São João Esporte Clube players
Sociedade Esportiva Palmeiras players
Santos FC players
Primeira Liga players
S.L. Benfica footballers
Brazil international footballers
2001 FIFA Confederations Cup players
2005 FIFA Confederations Cup players
FIFA Confederations Cup-winning players
Brazilian expatriate footballers
Expatriate footballers in Portugal
Brazilian expatriate sportspeople in Portugal
Sportspeople from Rio de Janeiro (state)